Alocasia reginae is a species of flowering plant in the family Araceae, native to Borneo. Occasionally kept as a houseplant, there are cultivars available, including 'Miri' and 'Elaine'.

References

reginae
House plants
Endemic flora of Borneo
Plants described in 1884
Taxa named by N. E. Brown